Mbongo (also Bongo) is a town in Lepi subdistrict, Longonjo municipality, Huambo Province, Angola, southwest Africa.

Bongo, as it is more often called, is the site of the Seventh-day Adventists' Adventist University of Angola, which is in the process of being rebuilt following the Angolan Civil War.

Notes

Populated places in Huambo Province